The Desperadoes is a 1943 American Western film directed by Charles Vidor and starring Randolph Scott, Claire Trevor, Glenn Ford, Evelyn Keyes and Edgar Buchanan. Based on a story by Max Brand, the film is about a wanted outlaw who arrives in town to rob a bank that has already been held up. His past and his friendship with the sheriff land them both in trouble. The Desperadoes was the first Columbia Pictures production to be released in Technicolor.

Plot
In 1863, Sheriff Steve Upton tries to keep the law in Red Valley, a small town in Utah. While he's away, the bank is robbed. The holdup was secretly masterminded by corrupt banker Stanley Clanton and the livery stable's boss, "Uncle Willie" McLeod, with the help of ruthless gunman Jack Lester, who shoots three innocent men.

Cheyenne Rogers rides to town. At the stable, Allison McLeod, daughter of Uncle Willie, recognizes the horse as one belonging to Steve. As the stranger goes to the saloon for a drink, Allison rides out to find Steve, whose mount was stolen on the trail.

"The Countess", who runs gambling at the saloon, is in love with Cheyenne, who was hired to help rob the bank but arrived too late. She blames herself for steering Cheyenne toward crime in the first place. Cheyenne finds a legitimate job, breaking broncos at a ranch.

Steve returns to town and is glad to see Cheyenne, an old friend. Lester turns the town against Cheyenne, revealing his outlaw past, and then his sidekick Nitro pulls off another robbery of the bank. A posse rounds up Cheyenne and Nitro and a judge sentences them to hang. But they are sprung from jail by Steve, who is then placed behind bars himself.

Alison goes to the Countess to beg for her help. She does, even though Cheyenne now loves Allison instead of her. Cheyenne slips a gun to Steve through a jailhouse window, and together they set about making things right. Uncle Willie, feeling guilt about his part in the robbery, ends up shooting Clanton in a gunfight. Allison is wed to Cheyenne while her father goes off to jail.

Cast
 Randolph Scott as Sheriff Steve Upton
 Claire Trevor as Countess Maletta
 Glenn Ford as Cheyenne Rogers
 Evelyn Keyes as Allison McLeod
 Edgar Buchanan as Uncle Willie McLeod
 Guinn 'Big Boy' Williams as  Nitro Rankin
 Raymond Walburn as Judge Cameron
 Porter Hall as Banker Clanton
 Bernard Nedell as Jack Lester (uncredited)
 Joan Woodbury as Sundown (uncredited)
 Irving Bacon as Dan Walters (uncredited)
 Glenn Strange as Lem (uncredited)

Production
The assistant director was Budd Boetticher, then using his real name, Oscar Boetticher, Jr. It was on this film that he met Scott and producer Brown. Fourteen years later, they would all re-team at Columbia to make the series of westerns known as the Ranown cycle (Ranown being a portmanteau of RANdolph and BrOWN).

Parts of the film were shot in Johnson Canyon, Kanab Canyon, the Gap, and Paria, Utah.

References

External links
 
 
 
 

1943 films
1943 Western (genre) films
American Civil War films
Columbia Pictures films
Films directed by Charles Vidor
Films scored by John Leipold
Films shot in Utah
American Western (genre) films
Revisionist Western (genre) films
1940s English-language films
1940s American films